Kelch is a surname of German-language origin and may have originated from one of the following meanings:  
the nickname "Kelch", which means "double chin" or "goiter" in Middle High German
"chalice" or "goblet" in German (wikt:Kelch, :de:wikt:Kelch)

Notable people with the surname include:

Alexander Kelch, Russian nobleman
Jim Kelch, American sports announcer
Pat Kelch (born 1966), Irish footballer

References

German-language surnames